The Cheyenne Indians: Their History and Lifeways (2008, World Wisdom) is a condensed version of a two volume non-fiction book (The Cheyenne Indians: Their History and Ways of Life) written by the anthropologist George Bird Grinnell, based on his account of his time spent among the last of the nomadic Cheyenne Native Americans.  It is one of Grinnell’s best known works and is of historical significance for its intimate first-hand account of life among the Cheyenne.

See also
George Bird Grinnell
Native American Studies

External links and further reading
 Official Book Page
 The Cheyenne Indians, Vol. 1: History and Society, (Bison Books, 1972) 
 The Cheyenne Indians, Vol. 2: War, Ceremonies, and Religion, (Bison Books, 1972)

References

Cheyenne tribe
Non-fiction books about Native Americans
2008 non-fiction books